Yegorov, or Yegorova (feminine; Егорова), is a common Russian last name that is derived from the male given name Yegor and literally means Yegor's. It may refer to:

 Aleksey Yegorov (b. 1975), Kazakhstani-Russian swimmer
 Alexander Ilyich Yegorov (1883-1939), Soviet military commander and Marshal of the Soviet Union
 Alexander Valentinovich Yegorov, Russian diplomat and ambassador
 Alexei Yegorov (disambiguation), multiple people
 Anatoly Yegorov (1920-1997), Soviet philosopher
 Boris Yegorov (1892-1972), Soviet neurosurgeon and academician
 Boris Yegorov (1937-1994), Soviet cosmonaut
 Daniil Yegorov (b. 1975), Russian economist
 Dimitri Egorov (1869-1931), Russian mathematician
 Dmitry Yegorov (1878-1931), Russian historian
 Georgiy Yegorov (1918-2008), Soviet Admiral of the Fleet
 Igor Yegorov (b. 1958), Ukrainian economist
 Igor Egorov (1968-), Russian football referee
 Lubov Egorova, (1880-1972), Russian dancer and teacher. 
 Lyubov Yegorova (b. 1966), Russian former cross country Olympic ski champion, many times world champion, and Hero of Russia
 Nikolai Yegorov (1849-1919), Russian politician
 Pavel Yegorov (1889/1895 — 1965), Soviet military commander
 Vladimir Yegorov (1878-1960), Russian/Soviet set designer
 Vladimir Yegorov, Russian governor
 Yevgeniya Yegorova (1892-1938), Soviet party figure and trade union activist
 Youri Egorov (1954-1988), Russian-Dutch pianist
 Yuri Yegorov (1920-1982), Soviet film director

Also places in Russia 
 Yegorov, Kursk Oblast, a khutor
 Yegorov, Rostov Oblast, a khutor

Russian-language surnames

ru:Егоров